The Queen Elisabeth Medical Foundation (QEMF) is a Belgian non-profit organization, founded in 1926 by Elisabeth of Bavaria, wife of Albert I. She founded the organization, based on her experience with the wounded from the front-line during the First World War. The foundation wants to encourage laboratory research and contacts between researchers and clinical practitioners, with a particular focus on neurosciences. The QEMF supports seventeen university teams throughout Belgium.

See also
 King Baudouin Foundation
 National Fund for Scientific Research
 Queen Elisabeth Music Competition
 Queen Fabiola Foundation for Mental Health

References

 Queen Elisabeth Medical Foundation

External links
 Queen Elisabeth Medical Foundation

Biomedical research foundations
Foundations based in Belgium
Medical and health organisations based in Belgium
1926 establishments in Belgium
Organizations established in 1926